John Kinder (born September 28, 1974 in Santa Ana, California) is a Japanese American stock car racing driver. He is a former competitor in the NASCAR SuperTruck Series by Craftsman and the Winston West Series, and in the USAR Hooters Pro Cup Series.

Career
Son of racer Jim Kinder, John Kinder began his racing career in 1991 at Mesa Marin Raceway in Bakersfield, California. Nicknamed "The Kid", Kinder competed in the NASCAR Winston West Series between 1995 and 1997, posting a best finish of second at Mesa Marin in 1996. He also competed in twelve events in the 1995 NASCAR SuperTruck Series presented by Craftsman, finishing 23rd in the series standings with a best finish of 13th, recorded at Evergreen Speedway and Flemington Speedway.

In 1997, Kinder was selected to participate in the Suzuka Thunder Special, a NASCAR exhibition race held at Suzuka Circuit in Japan; he was the only Japanese-American driver to compete in the event, and he finished 17th in the race. In 1998 he moved to the ARCA Racing Series, competing in six races over two years with a best finish of eighth at Atlanta Motor Speedway, then to the Hooters Pro Cup Series from 1999 to 2003 for PowerBase Motorsports, competing in 59 races with a best finish of third at Concord Speedway. He has not competed in major-league stock car racing since 2003.

Motorsports career results

NASCAR
(key) (Bold – Pole position awarded by qualifying time. Italics – Pole position earned by points standings or practice time. * – Most laps led.)

SuperTruck Series

References

External links
 

1974 births
Living people
Sportspeople from Santa Ana, California
Racing drivers from California
NASCAR drivers
CARS Tour drivers
American sportspeople of Japanese descent